Monteleone di Puglia is a hill town and comune of the province of Foggia in the Apulia region of south-eastern Italy.

Its territory borders the municipalities of Accadia, Anzano di Puglia, Ariano Irpino (AV), Panni, San Sossio Baronia (AV), Sant'Agata di Puglia, Savignano Irpino (AV), Zungoli (AV).

History
The town was historically inhabited by Provençal refugees (followers of the Waldensian Protestant rite) and Arbëreshë community, but both have since assimilated.

In 1942, during World War II, Monteleone was the seat of a  revolt women, sparked by the arrogance of a Carabinieri officer who confiscated a pot of corn flour that was being carried to a local bakery by three women. The women resisted, pleading with the officer. The women were brought by the officer to the Fascist regime-appointed mayor. The mayor sided with the officer, and the women were promptly imprisoned in a warehouse filled with cheese and other foods. The women set the warehouse on fire and escaped. Upon hearing of the hoards of food being stored by the Carabinieri while the people were hungry, an angry mob formed and the Carabinieri office was stormed. Police had trouble controlling the riot and fired warning shots into the air. Soon after, police began firing bullets towards the crowd. Eventually, the citizens of Monteleone - armed with clubs and pitchforks - were subdued when renfoircements were sent by the prefect of Foggia, Giovanni Dolfin. Overall, 180 citizens were arrested and detained. Most rioters arrested had to serve a prison sentence of between a few days and 15 months. This revolt was the first of its kind in Italy during the Second World War.

In the years following the war, a large number of migrants from the town and their descendants established an expatriate community in Toronto, Ontario, Canada. There is a club in Toronto for those who have roots in Monteleone.

Festivals
The patron saints of Monteleone are San Rocco and Saint John the Baptist.

People
Monteleone is the birthplace of the Canadian politician Joe Volpe.

References

External links
 Official website
 Italiani.ca - Web magazine for Italian-Canadians
 Page at comuni italiani website

 

Arbëresh settlements 

Cities and towns in Apulia
Hilltowns in Apulia